Moose Lake is a city in Carlton County, Minnesota, United States. The population was 2,789 at the 2020 census.

Interstate 35, State Highways 27 and 73, County 10, and County 61 are the main routes in Moose Lake.

Moose Lake State Park is nearby.

Geography

The boundary between Carlton and Pine counties is nearby.

Moose Lake is 25 miles southwest of Cloquet, 43 miles southwest of Duluth, and 112 miles north of Minneapolis–Saint Paul.

Climate
Like the rest of Minnesota, Moose Lake has a humid continental climate. Like the rest of northern Minnesota, it has the warm-summer variety with relatively cool nights year-round. Winter temperatures are very cold but dry compared to summer.

History
Moose Lake was one of the communities affected by the massive 1918 Cloquet Fire. The Minneapolis, St. Paul and Sault Ste. Marie Depot is a museum that tells the story of that fire. The Minnesota Home Guard assisted the area after the fire.

Demographics

2010 census
As of the census of 2010, there were 2,751 people, 648 households, and 318 families living in the city. The racial makeup of the city was 79.2% White, 14.4% African American, 3.7% Native American, 0.9% Asian, 0.5% from other races, and 1.2% from two or more races. Hispanic or Latino of any race were 4.0% of the population.

There were 648 households, of which 24.4% had children under the age of 18 living with them, 33.2% were married couples living together, 11.6% had a female householder with no husband present, 4.3% had a male householder with no wife present, and 50.9% were non-families. 46.6% of all households were made up of individuals, and 27.8% had someone living alone who was 65 years of age or older. The average household size was 2.01 and the average family size was 2.84.

The median age in the city was 39 years. 11.1% of residents were under the age of 18; 9.2% were between the ages of 18 and 24; 39.9% were from 25 to 44; 25.7% were from 45 to 64; and 14.1% were 65 years of age or older. The gender makeup of the city was 73.4% male and 26.6% female.

2000 census
As of the census of 2000, there were 2,239 people, 577 households, and 294 families living in the city. The racial makeup of the city was 79.99% White, 11.61% African American, 3.75% Native American, 0.80% Asian, 1.38% from other races, and 2.46% from two or more races. Hispanic or Latino of any race were 3.53% of the population. 22.9% were of German, 10.9% Norwegian, 10.3% Swedish, 9.8% Finnish, 6.3% Polish and 5.1% Irish ancestry.

There were 577 households, out of which 25.1% had children under the age of 18 living with them, 38.5% were married couples living together, 9.7% had a female householder with no husband present, and 49.0% were non-families. 46.3% of all households were made up of individuals, and 29.8% had someone living alone who was 65 years of age or older.  The average household size was 2.03 and the average family size was 2.88.

In the city, the population was spread out, with 12.6% under the age of 18, 13.7% from 18 to 24, 38.4% from 25 to 44, 17.3% from 45 to 64, and 18.0% who were 65 years of age or older.  The median age was 37 years. For every 100 females, there were 197.3 males.  For every 100 females age 18 and over, there were 227.1 males.

The median income for a household in the city was $27,130, and the median income for a family was $37,917. Males had a median income of $31,641 versus $24,167 for females. The per capita income for the city was $14,128.  About 5.0% of families and 10.1% of the population were below the poverty line, including 11.6% of those under age 18 and 8.8% of those age 65 or over.

Media
The Moose Lake Star Gazette was founded in 1983. It is a weekly that comes out on Thursdays. It is owned by Franklin Newspapers and had a circulation of 1774 in 2019. The following newspapers have also been published in Moose Lake:
 Moose Lake Star (1896–1906)
 Star Gazette  (1907–1962)
 Moose Lake Star Gazette (1962–1978)
 Star-gazette (1978–1983)
 Arrowhead leader (since 1982)

Transportation
The Moose Lake Carlton County Airport is three miles southwest of the city and has a lighted, paved, 3,200-foot runway.

Business
One of Minnesota's Sex Offender Program's two facilities is in Moose Lake.

References

External links
Moose Lake Area Chamber of Commerce website
City of Moose Lake website
Moose Lake Schools website
Moose Lake Star-Gazette - newspaper website
Moose Lake State Park - DNR website entry

Cities in Carlton County, Minnesota
Cities in Minnesota